Gurgaon Assembly constituency is one of the 90 constituencies in the Haryana Legislative Assembly of Haryana a north state of India. Gurgaon is also part of Gurgaon Lok Sabha constituency.

Members of Legislative Assembly
1967: Pratap Singh Thakran, Bharatiya Jan Sangh
1968: Mahabir Singh, Indian National Congress
1972: Mahabir Singh, Indian National Congress
1977: Pratap Singh Thakran, Janata Party
1982: Dharambir Gaba, Indian National Congress (I)
1987: Sita Ram Singhla, Bharatiya Janata Party
1991: Dharambir Gaba, Indian National Congress
1996: Dharambir Gaba, Indian National Congress
2000: Gopi Chand Gahlot, Independent
2005: Dharambir Gaba, Indian National Congress
2009: Sukhbir Kataria, Independent
2014: Umesh Aggarwal, Bharatiya Janata Party

Election results

2019 results

2014 result

2009 result

See also

 Gurgaon
 Gurgaon district
 List of constituencies of the Haryana Legislative Assembly

References

Gurgaon
Assembly constituencies of Haryana